VL40U — AC electric locomotive used in Ukraine.

Electric locomotives of Ukraine